The Duchy of Lancaster Act 1787  (27 Geo 3 c 34) is an Act of the Parliament of Great Britain.

This Act was partly in force in Great Britain at the end of 2010.

Section 2
References in this section to an amount of money in the old currency which are not a whole number of pounds must, in so far as they refer to an amount in shillings or pence, be read  as referring to the equivalent of that amount in the new currency.

In this section, the words "after deducting the land tax chargeable thereon" were repealed by section 1(1) of, and Group 3 of Part II of Schedule 1 to, the Statute Law (Repeals) Act 1989.

Section 3
This section was repealed by section 1(1) of, and Group 3 of Part VII of Schedule 1 to, the Statute Law (Repeals) Act 1989

References
Halsbury's Statutes,

External links
The Duchy of Lancaster Act 1787, as amended, from Legislation.gov.uk.

Great Britain Acts of Parliament 1787
Duchy of Lancaster